Camp Four, Camp 4, or Camp IV may refer to:

 Camp 4 (Yosemite), in Yosemite National Park in California
 Camp Four (Fort Smith, Montana), listed on the NRHP in Montana
 Camp Four, California, former name of Camphora, California
 Camp 4, Guantanamo, the camp within the Guantanamo Bay detention camps for the most compliant captives
 Camp IV, on Mount Everest, the final camp on the southern ascent route, on the South Col